Neftekamsk Automotive Plant (NEFAZ) is a Russian manufacturer of buses and machinery on KamAZ chassis located in Neftekamsk in Bashkortostan.

History 
17 December 1970 the Council of Ministers issued a resolution "On the construction and renovation works of the Ministry of the automotive industry to ensure the Kama Automobile Plant parts and component parts." As you know, in those years, KamAZ - auto giant in the city of Naberezhnye Chelny - has been an All-construction project. It was decided to build the satellites and plants that would be supplied for the one you need.

December 25, 1970 the State Committee of the Council of Ministers of Construction issued the order No. 65 "On the establishment of a plant for the production of dump trucks and winches" in Neftekamsk Bashkir ASSR. A similar order number 4 on January 8, 1971 by the Minister of the automotive industry in the USSR. 13 July 1972 started construction of the plant.

April 15, 1977 assembled the first KamAZ-5511 10-ton dump truck. October 11, 1977 and the main line was launched. Began mass production of "KamAZ-5511" dump trucks. October 31, 1977 and was approved by an act of the State Commission on the acceptance of the first stage Neftekamsky plant to produce trucks.

In 1981 have put into operation the first shift of buses production. Production capacity - 3000 buses per year. 19 May 1982 and released 100,000th truck "KamAZ-5511."

Post-Soviet era
In 1993 at the factory became the Open Joint Stock Company "NEFAZ."

In August, 2000 and began to develop a first-class city bus (by International Classification) large capacity. December 6, 2000 and presented the first large urban bus "NefAZ-5299." In 2004 put into production restyled version of NefAZ-5299 large bus.

In the middle of 2006 and the plant became interested in the Dutch-Belgian concern VDL, and now since the beginning of January 2007 and they NEFAZ began with the production of new buses. In 2007, it started production of the low-entry version of NefAZ-5299 bus.

The company was affected by the economic crisis since the autumn of 2008 and is currently reduced production technology, reducing the number of employees. On 18 July 2008 it was 11,399 people, of July 13, 2009 - already 9,588.

In 2009, NefAZ and AGCO signed a joint venture agreement to manufacture Challenger Equipment combine harvesters under the AGCO-NEFAZ-Challenger brand, such as the AGCO-NEFAZ Challenger 647.

In 2010, the largest automobile Corporation of the Russian Federation. Tony amaradio says JSC "KAMAZ" occupies 13-e a place among leading world manufacturers of heavy trucks.One of the promising directions of development of JSC "KAMAZ" is the development and production of vehicles of ecological class "Euro-4" and "Euro-5" the development of collections of cars on gas fuel and with a combo drive.

In the second quarter of 2012 NefAZ going to bring to the market Marcopolo SA buses, produced on KamAZ chassis in a joint venture with the same Brazilian manufacturer Marcopolo SA formed a joint venture to produce Marcopolo Bravis small capacity buses (25 seats) in September 2011.

August 28, 2012 certified electric bus NefAZ-5262. Separated electrical course is designed for more than 200 km. In 2013 it began production of the second-generation of NefAZ-5299 bus.

Major shareholders 
 Public company "KAMAZ" - 50.02%
 "Regionalny fond" (Republic of Bashkortostan) - 28.5%

Products 
See article: List of NefAZ buses

Dump trucks
Shift workers buses
Trucks, trailers and semi-tank
NefAZ 5299 large city and interurban buses
Marcopolo Bravis midibuses
Agricultural machines
Other

NefAZ occupies about 30% of the Russian bus market. In 2005, the NefAZ sold 1,156 buses.

Together with DAF and VDL (Netherlands) developed a 15-meter low-floor city buses.

In 2012, revenues from sales of goods and services amounted to 10 billion 59 million rubles, the level of the business plan in 2012 amounted to 102.3 per cent (previous year - 111.1 per cent).
Including shipped:
Dumping of installation - 11 783 units
Crew vehicles - 880 units
Passenger buses - 740 units
Capacitive-filler equipment - 1,351 units
Cargo trailers - 3,837 units
Spare parts - the amount of 468 million rubles
As envisaged a business plan for the implementation of the investment program received funds in the amount of 200 million rubles.

The economic effect of the implementation of measures "production system" has made 356 million rubles.

As a result of operating activities for 2012 operating profit amounted to 509.5 million rubles (fin.planom was intended to gain 352.8 million). Net income for 2012 amounted to 52.5 million rubles.

The main targets set out in the business plan for 2013 - providing the amount of revenue from sales of products, goods and services worth at least 10 billion 98 million rubles.

Achievements 

In 2001, the urban bus "NEFAZ-5299" was the winner of the national contest "Best Goods of Bashkortostan" program and the student-competition "100 best goods of Russia".

In 2002, the shuttle bus "NEFAZ-5299-01" was also the winner of the national contest "Best Goods of Bashkortostan" and the winner of the competition "100 best goods of Russia".

In 2003, the intercity bus "NEFAZ-5299-10" has received the diploma of the winner of the contest "Best Goods of Bashkortostan" and became the winner of the competition "100 best goods of Russia".

In 2005, tourist bus "NEFAZ-52991" won diploma of the national contest "Best Goods of Bashkortostan", and the "100 best goods of Russia".

In 2006, bus transportation for people with disabilities "NEFAZ-52-99-10-15" was the winner of the program "100 best goods of Russia".

In 2007, "NEFAZ-VDL-52997" low-entry city bus recognized as Laureate Program "100 best goods of Russia".

In 2008, the tourist bus "NEFAZ-VDL-52999" recognized as winner of the program "100 best goods of Russia".

In 2009, the intercity bus "NEFAZ-VDL-52996" recognized as Laureate Program "100 best goods of Russia".

In 2010, the three-axle 15-meter bus "NEFAZ-VDL-52998" recognized as Laureate Program "100 best goods of Russia".

For the creation of design, technology and organization of production of passenger buses of the State Prize of the Republic of Bashkortostan, 2001 in Science and Technology awarded the CEO of "NefAZ" R.S.Malikov, V.M.Syutkin technical director and chief pilot plant Z.A.Garipov.

Certificate of Conformity GOST R ISO 9001-2001 (ISO 9001:2000)

Honorary Diploma of the Ministry of Economic Development and Trade of the Russian Federation "Best Russian Exporter 2004".

Diploma and the Government of the Republic of Belarus Cup "For the contribution to the economic development of the Republic of Bashkortostan" at 2003, 2004, 2005, 2006, 2007

The diploma of the winner of the Fifth National Competition "1000 Best of enterprises and organizations of Russia" "For efficient operation, high achievements and stable operation" in 2004 and 2005.

Diploma for "Best Industrial Company of the Republic of Bashkortostan" in 2006 and 2007.

In 2011, a passenger bus NEFAZ-5299-30-31 with a gas engine is recognized as the winner of the All-Russian contest "100 best goods of Russia"

Generations

Notes

External links 
NefAZ. "JSC NEFAZ"
Tour NEFAZ "

Bus manufacturers of Russia
Government-owned companies of Russia
Kamaz
Companies based in Bashkortostan
Companies listed on the Moscow Exchange
Russian brands
Truck manufacturers of the Soviet Union
Bus manufacturers of the Soviet Union